The Joseph Clarke School is a school for pupils with visual impairment and additional or complex needs in Highams Park, North London.

External links
 Joseph Clarke School website

Schools for the blind in the United Kingdom
Special schools in the London Borough of Waltham Forest
Academies in the London Borough of Waltham Forest